List of schools in Lake Charles, Louisiana, United States:

Colleges and universities 
McNeese State University offers both graduate and undergraduate degrees.

Vocational and technological schools 
Delta School of Business and Technology
Sowela Technical Community College

Public elementary education 

 A.A. Nelson Elementary School
 Barbe Elementary School
 Brentwood Elementary School
 College Oaks Elementary School
 Cypress Cove Elementary School
 Dolby Elementary School
 Fairview Elementary School
 Frasch Elementary School
 Henry Heights Elementary School
 Jessie D. Clifton Elementary
 J.J. Johnson Elementary School
 Moss Bluff Elementary School
 Pearl Watson Elementary School
 Prien Lake Elementary School
 R.W. Vincent Elementary
 T.S. Cooley Elementary Magnet School
 Westwood Elementary School
 W.T. Henning Elementary School
 T.H. Watkins Elementary School
 J.I. Watson Elementary School
 M.J. Kaufman Elementary School
 St.John Elementary School
 Combre-Fondel Elementary School
 Western Heights Elementary School
 Vincent Settlement Elementary
 Vinton Elementary

Public middle school education 

 F.K. White Middle School
 J.I. Watson Middle School
 LeBlanc Middle School
 Moss Bluff Middle School
 Oak Park Middle School
 Ray D. Molo Middle School
 Reynaud Middle School
 S.J. Welsh Middle School
 S.P. Arnett Middle School
 W.W. Lewis Middle School
 Maplewood Middle School
 Molo Middle School
 Vinton Middle School

Private K-8 education 
 Bishop Noland Episcopal Day School
 Hamilton Christian Academy
 Immaculate Conception Cathedral School
 Covenant Grace Academy 
 Our Lady Queen of Heaven Catholic School
 St. Margaret's of Scotland Catholic School

Public high school education 
Alfred M. Barbe High School
 Bell City High School K-12
DeQuincy High School
LaGrange High School
Sam Houston High School
Starks High K-12
Sulphur High School
 Sulphur High 9th Grade Campus
Washington Marion Magnet High School
Westlake High School
W. O. Boston High School
Vinton High School

Private high school education institutions 
Hamilton Christian Academy
St. Louis Catholic High School

Others

Lake Charles Boston Academy of Learning
 Lake Charles Charter Academy (K-8)
 Southwest Louisiana Charter Academy (K-8)
 Lake Charles College Prep (9-12)

Christian schools
 Bishop Noland Episcopal Day School
 Covenant Grace Academy

Lake Charles, Louisiana
Schools in Calcasieu Parish, Louisiana
Lake Charles